Aleksandar Kicev Turundzhev was a Bulgarian revolutionary from Ottoman Macedonia and leader of the Lerin cheta of the Internal Macedonian Adrianople Revolutionary Organization. According to the post-WWII Macedonian historiography, he was an ethnic Macedonian.

Biography 

He was born in 1872 in the village of Gorno Varbeni in Monastir Vilayet (today Xino Nero in Amyntaio, Greece). He joined the IMARO while he was young as a rebel and took part in terrorist operations. Starting in 1902 he was under the command of the Bulgarian officer Georgi Papanchev, but after his death in May, by June 1903 he becomes a voyvoda of the cheta in Florina.

In the time of the Ilinden Uprising he played a big part in the battles in the territory around Lerin. During all the years of illegal residence and movement, Turundzhev regularly surrounded the villages in Lerin and some in Lower Prespa and Bitola.

Ilinden–Preobrazhenie Uprising 
After the decision to begin a rebellion on the Salonica Congress of IMARO and its confirmation on the Smilevo Congress, Turundzhev was given the task to organize his own village and prepare it for the uprising.

When finished with the military training of his fellow villagers of all ages, but mostly aged 20–25 years, Turundzhev with all of them, about 230 people, made a training, organized several Thalia (maneuver) with that in the improvised clashes between insurgents. During the Ilinden Uprising in Lerin was fulfilled the directive given on the Smilevo Congress for guerrilla mode of warfare. Turundzhev mobilized a total of 500 fighters, with including 100 rebels from his native village.

Ottoman commanders drafted a detailed plan of the counteroffensive against Macedono-Bulgarian revolutionary, rebel units. To stop the uprising, the vilayet authorities made a decision to accommodate a new unit in the village of Turundzhev on 14 November 1903.

The presence of the Ottoman units did not scare the IMRO members of Ekshi su, and it didn't srop the organization's activity of Turundzhev, who began a reconstruction of the revolutionary net in his region.

Death 

On the end of 1904 he was betrayed by Mitre Ginkov in the village of Aetos. He was captured and taken to the Turkish court in Bitola, where he was sentenced to death. His punishment was done in public, on 29 August 1905 in front of Bitola's At-bazaar he is killed with hanging. According to the British Consul in Thessaloniki, Robert Graves, the same day several thousand citizens followed the coffin, which was covered with wreaths from the Bulgarian Church congregation. His grave is in the cemeteries Saint Nedela in Bitola.

References

External links 
Image from a card from the brother of Turundzhev 
Во Битола одбележани 107 години од смртта на Александар Турунџев 
Илюстрация Бело море, 106 години от смъртта на Александър Турунджов. 

1872 births
1905 deaths
People from Amyntaio
Members of the Internal Macedonian Revolutionary Organization
Executed revolutionaries
People executed by the Ottoman Empire by hanging
20th-century executions by the Ottoman Empire
Bulgarian revolutionaries
Macedonian Bulgarians
Bulgarian people murdered abroad
Executed Bulgarian people